Klimeschiola is a genus of snout moths. It was described by Roesler in 1965. It contains only one species, Klimeschiola philetella, which is found in mainland Greece and on Crete.

The wingspan is 16–19 mm.

References

Phycitini
Monotypic moth genera
Moths of Europe
Pyralidae genera